Zarur may refer to:
Giselle Zarur (born 1987), Mexican sports journalist and television reporter
Guillermo Zarur (1932–2011), Mexican actor
Zarur, Iran